Anwar al-Hamadani  (born April 2, 1974, Baghdad) is an Iraqi television presenter for the Al-Baghdadia TV. He received an arrest warrant after one of the guests on Hamdani's show,  was very critical of Nouri al-Maliki, calling him "corrupt" and "sectarian."

References

Living people
Iraqi television presenters
1974 births